Hurricane Rick was a powerful hurricane that threatened Hawaii during September 1985, but ultimately passed with minimal effects. The storm was the twentieth tropical cyclone, eighteenth named storm, eighth hurricane, and fifth major hurricane of the very active 1985 Pacific hurricane season. Rick originated from a tropical wave moved slowly westward over the warm waters south of Salina Cruz. Moving westward, the EPHC upgraded the low into a tropical depression on 0000 UTC September 1. The depression was upgraded into Tropical Storm Rick midday on September 2. Initially, further intensification was slow to occur; the storm did not attain hurricane status until September 7, nearly a week after it first formed. After becoming a hurricane, Rick began to intensify more rapidly. Early the next day, the EPHC re-assessed the intensity of Rick to Category 4 status. A weakening trend commenced on September 10; Hurricane Rick began to rapidly deteriorate while turning northwest. Within a few hours, the storm had weakened considerably. By September 11, Tropical Storm Rick merged with a trough. Early forecasts noted uncertainty in the storm's path; the hurricane approached the Hawaiian island group, coming close enough to require a high surf advisory. Even though Hurricane Rick turned north sooner than Pauline, the surf did rise slightly.

Meteorological history

Hurricane Rick originated from a tropical wave that moved slowly westward south of Salina Cruz. Despite warm waters, the wave was slow to develop due to strong vertical wind shear in the vicinity of the system. It moved westward because a strong ridge that extended from the Hawaiian Islands to the Southwestern United States was north of the disturbance. Satellite imagery indicated that the thunderstorm activity had increased in the vicinity of the wave on August 31. A surface circulation began to form; subsequently, the Eastern Pacific Hurricane Center (EPHC) upgraded the low into Tropical Depression Eighteen at 0000 UTC on September 1. The depression continued west, and was upgraded into Tropical Storm Rick midday on September 2. Initially expected to turn north and approach the Baja California Peninsula, the system briefly slowed and turned southwest while the ridge dough southward, but the storm resumed a westerly course on September 4.

After becoming a hurricane, Rick began to intensify more rapidly. About 30 hours after becoming a hurricane, Rick attained Category 2 status on the present-day Saffir-Simpson Hurricane Wind Scale (SSHWS). By 1200 UTC on September 8, Rick reached Category 3 status. Six hours later, the storm's forecast responsibility was handed over to the Central Pacific Hurricane Center (CPHC). At peak, one newspaper described Rick as "one of the strongest and best developed [hurricanes] on record". Moreover, Hurricane Rick was, at that time, the second intense hurricane on record in the CPHC's area of responsibility; only Hurricane Patsy during the 1959 Pacific hurricane season exceeded Rick in intensity. Since then, however, many storms have suppressed Rick in terms of both wind speed and pressure.

Following a path similar to Pauline, the hurricane moved northwest, encountering increased southwesterly shear, which commenced a weakening trend. On September 10, Rick's eye started to become ragged and cloud-filled, when it was downgraded into a Category 3 hurricane. Recurving away from Hawaii, the system began to rapidly deteriorate and was reduced to a Category 1 hurricane during the evening hours of September 10. Later that day, the tropical storm merged with the same trough that absorbed Hurricane Pauline several days earlier. Despite this, a weak low-level circulation persisted for several more days.

Preparations and impact
Early forecasts remarked the potential to be more of a threat to Hawaii than Pauline because Rick was further south than Pauline and thus less likely to weaken since Rick was over of warmer sea surface temperatures than Pauline. It did indeed approached the islands, coming close enough to require a high surf advisory. Even though Rick's intensity was much greater than Pauline's, Hurricane Pauline re-curved sooner than Rick. While the surf did rise somewhat, the waves were significantly lower than the heights experienced during Pauline. The U.S. Coast Guard received a report of an overdue sailing vessel en route to the Hawaiian Island group. However, it is unknown if Pauline or Rick affected the boat's course.

See also

List of Hawaii hurricanes
Timeline of the 1985 Pacific hurricane season

References

1985 Pacific hurricane season
Category 4 Pacific hurricanes
Hurricanes in Hawaii
1985 in Hawaii
Rick